Jaak Juske (born on the 12 December 1976) is an Estonian journalist, historian, author, politician and a member of the Social Democratic Party of Estonia.

Born in Tartu, Juske is also the Chairman of the 8-member Social Democratic Party wing in the City Council of Tallinn and the Vice Chairman of the party's Tallinn district. He is also the Chairman of the party's Northern Tallinn section.

Since 2000, Juske has been giving lectures in a radio show called Roosiaed.

Education
 1984–1995 – Tartu Descartes Lyceum
 1999–2003 – Visitor Student at Tartu University
 1999–2000 – Practical work at the Estonian Evangelical Lutheran Church of Sangaste Parish
 1995–2005 – Theology in Tartu Academy of Theology and in Estonian Evangelical Lutheran Church Institute of Theology
 From 2008 – History at Tallinn University

Career
 1994 – A journalist at the biggest public daily newspaper – Postimees
 1997–1998 – Public Relations Officer of the People's Union of Estonia and the Right-Wing Party of Estonia
 1999 – Election campaign leader of the party Mõõdukad in Elva
 1999–2002 – Councillor of People's Union Party of Mõõdukad of Estonia at the City Council of Tallinn
 2002–2003 – Councillor of Mõõdukad Party at Estonian Parliament – Riigikogu
 2003–2004 – NATO Association project leader
 2004–2005 – Public Relations Officer of the Social-Democratic Party of Estonia and election campaign leader
 2005–2009 – Councillor of the Social-Democratic Party at the City Council of Tallinn
 2009 – Election campaign leader of the Social-Democratic Party in Tallinn
 2004–2010 – Chairman of the Social-Democratic Party’s Tallinn district
 2009-2013 – Chairman of the Social-Democratic wing at the City Council of Tallinn; Chairman of the Commission of the City Property; member of the Justice Commission and Monetary Commission
 2009-2013 – Vice Chairman of the administrative board of Northern Tallinn and Chairman of the Entrepreneurship Commission of Northern Tallinn
 2009-2011 – AS Tallinn Industrial Parks Council member
 2010–2013 -  Vice Chairman of the City Council of Tallinn; Chairman of the Social-Democratic wing
 From 2009 - Member of the Tallinn City Council

Political activities

Member of political parties
 1997–1999 – The Right-Wing Party of Estonia (from 1998 People's Union Party)
 From 1999 – The Social Democratic Party of Estonia (up until 2004 People's Union Party of Moderate)

Activities in the City Council of Tallinn
Juske is one of the members of the Coalition Council of Tallinn, representing the Social Democratic Party of Estonia. As being the Vice Chairman of the City Council of Tallinn, he has also stood for the resilience financing of kindergartens in Tallinn.

Public activities
From 2000, Juske is a member of Estonian Students' Society. He is also a co-publisher of a book called Viisaastak õpilasmalevas.

Personal life
Jaak Juske is married to Kristi Juske. He has three children. His father, Ants Juske, is an art scientist and his mother, Mare Väli, is a psychologist.

References

Social Democratic Party (Estonia) politicians
1976 births
Living people
Politicians from Tartu
Writers from Tartu
People's Union of Estonia politicians
Estonian journalists
21st-century Estonian historians
Historians of Estonia
University of Tartu alumni
Tallinn University alumni
21st-century Estonian politicians